Playa Leona is a corregimiento in La Chorrera District, Panamá Oeste Province, Panama with a population of 8,442 as of 2010. Its population as of 1990 was 4,279; its population as of 2000 was 6,706.

References

Corregimientos of Panamá Oeste Province